INSAT-4B was an Indian communications satellite which forms part of the Indian National Satellite System. Launched in 2007, it was placed in geostationary orbit at a longitude of 93.48° East.

Built by the Indian Space Research Organisation, INSAT-4B is based upon the I-3K satellite bus. Two solar arrays power the satellite, while its communications payload consists of twelve C and twelve  transponders.

Arianespace was contracted to launch INSAT-4B using an Ariane 5 ECA carrier rocket. The launch occurred on 11 March 2007 at 22:03 UTC, from ELA-3 at Kourou. The Skynet 5A military communications satellite for the British Ministry of Defence was launched aboard the same rocket.

INSAT-4B was successfully inserted into geosynchronous transfer orbit, from which it raised itself into geostationary orbit using a liquid-fuelled apogee motor. It received the International Designator 2007-007A and Satellite Catalog Number 30793.

Partial power failure 
On 10 July 2010 INSAT-4B suffered a disruption in power supply from one of the two solar panels, rendering half of its transponder capacity useless. After review the cause of malfunction was found out to be electric arcing in slip ring of one of the solar panels. Similar partial power supply failure also affected Eutelsat W2M now known as Afghansat 1 and caused delay in launch of GSAT-8 due to required design changes in relevant power systems of satellite bus.

Relocation 
On 11 November 2017, INSAT-4B maneuvered to lower its altitude and drifted eastward to reach new slot at 111.2°E on 18 December 2017.

On 20 August 2019, altitude of INSAT-4B was raised and it was relocated to new 83°E slot on 12 October 2019.

On 15 February 2020, altitude of INSAT-4B was lowered and it was relocated to new 85.5°E slot on 20 February 2020.

Decommissioning 
Towards the end of its life INSAT-4B was placed in Graveyard orbit under post mission disposal procedure and subsequently decommissioned on 24 January 2022, in accordance with the  space debris mitigation guidelines recommended by UN and the Inter Agency Space Debris Coordination Committee (IADC).

References

Spacecraft launched in 2007
INSAT satellites
2007 in India
Spacecraft decommissioned in 2022